Two ships of the United States Navy have been named Crow:

See also
 

United States Navy ship names